Nałęcz is a Polish coat of arms. It was used by associated szlachta families in the Kingdom of Poland (see Kingdom of Poland (1320–1385), and Kingdom of Poland (1385–1569)) and the Polish–Lithuanian Commonwealth (1569–1795).

History

Nałęcz is a Polish coat of arms from the 12th century (like the Abdank, Leliwa, Radwan, and Bogorya coats of arms) that represented unity and harmony.  It was used by the Gembiccy, Ostrorogowie, Szamotulscy, Chełmicki, Czarnkowscy, Slizewicz, Raczyńscy, Dworniccy, Sadowski, Łowińscy, Grąbczewscy and other families. It is traditionally described as a silver shawl, tied, on a red background. Most versions had the shawl tied downwards; some were tied upwards. Earlier versions and some modern ones depict the shawl untied. The shawl is similar in shape to the Teutonic image of Rune Othila, the Rune of a Fatherland.

The Nałęcz arms were initially connected with Greater Poland. The Nałęcze were accused of murdering Przemysł II in 1296. They also allied with Brandenburg against Władysław I Łokietek, and after the death of Louis I of Hungary waged war against the Grzymalites, attempting to put Ziemowit III of Masovia forcibly on the throne of Poland.

The best-known Poles who bore these arms were Joseph Conrad (Korzeniowski) and Sędziwój Ostroróg.
A Nałęcz relief is on the Guard House building in Poznań.

Blazon
In heraldic English, the shield may be blazoned: Gules the Nałęcz shawl circled and knotted Argent.

Notable bearers
Notable bearers of this coat of arms have included:
 Kazimierz Franciszek Czarnkowski
 Adam Sędziwój Czarnkowski
 Czesław "Jurand" Grombczewski
 Apollo Korzeniowski
 Joseph Conrad Korzeniowski
 House of Małachowski
 Jacek Małachowski
 Stanisław Małachowski
 Fryderyk Józef Moszyński
 Mikołaj Ostroróg
 Edward Raczyński (1786–1845)
 Edward Aleksander Raczyński
 Edward Bernard Raczyński
 Józef Sosnowski
 Józef Karol Konrad Chełmicki
 Benedykt Dybowski

Gallery
Standard variations

Aristocratic variations

Other

See also
 Polish heraldry
 Heraldic family
 List of Polish nobility coats of arms

Bibliography

 Juliusz Karol Ostrowski: Księga herbowa rodów polskich. T. 1-2. Warszawa: Główny skład księgarnia antykwarska B. Bolcewicza, 1897.
 Adam Boniecki: Herbarz polski. Warszawa: skł. gł. Gebethner i Wolff, 1899.
 Franciszek Piekosiński: Heraldyka polska wieków średnich. Kraków: Akademia Umiejętności, 1899.
 Józef Szymański: Herbarz średniowiecznego rycerstwa polskiego. Warszawa: PWN, 1993. .
 Anna Wajs: Materiały genealogiczne, nobilitacje, indygenaty w zbiorach Archiwum Głównego Akt Dawnych w Warszawie. Warszawa: DiG, 2001. .
 Alfred Znamierowski: Herbarz rodowy. Warszawa: Świat Książki, 2004. .
 Tadeusz Gajl: Herbarz polski od średniowiecza do XX wieku : ponad 4500 herbów szlacheckich 37 tysięcy nazwisk 55 tysięcy rodów. L&L, 2007. .
 Tadeusz Gajl: Nowy herbarz polski. 5 000 herbow + 50 000 nazwisk. Gdański Kantor Wydawniczy, 2016.

References

External links 
 

Polish coats of arms